Junan County is a county of southern Shandong province, People's Republic of China, bordering Jiangsu province to the south. It is under the administration of Linyi City.

Administrative divisions
As 2012, this County is divided to 16 towns and 2 townships.
Towns

Townships
Daokou Township
Xianggou Township

Climate

References

External links 
 Official homepage

Counties of Shandong
Linyi